The Freeport Rail Bridge is a truss bridge that carries the Norfolk Southern Railway across the Allegheny River between Freeport and Allegheny Township in Pennsylvania.

A structure originally created on this site by the Pennsylvania Railroad as part of their West Penn Line in 1866.  In 1895, the railroad replaced this bridge; the third and current incarnation was completed in 1950, along with new approach ramps that eliminated a narrow tunnel.

Prior to 1957, passenger service was carried along this line (the Conemaugh Line) alongside freight.  Following the decline of the PRR, Conrail took over control of the bridge. Currently, it is operated as part of the Pittsburgh Division of Norfolk Southern.

See also
List of crossings of the Allegheny River

References

KVRR History
Rail Fan
History of the PRR

Bridges over the Allegheny River
Bridges completed in 1950
Steel bridges in the United States
Truss bridges in the United States